Aysel Çelikel (born 1933) is a Turkish academic, legal scholar and author who served as the first Minister of Justice of Turkey at 57th Cabinet. She was neither a Member of Parliament nor in political affiliation. She appointed as independent minister by PM Bülent Ecevit in accordance to Article 114 of the Constitution three months before the 1999 general election.

Aysel Çelikel is currently the Chairwoman of the Association for the Support of Contemporary Living.

References 

Living people
1933 births
Turkish legal scholars
Academic staff of Istanbul University
Istanbul University Faculty of Law alumni
Columbia Law School alumni
Beyoğlu Anatolian High School alumni
Women academic administrators
Members of the 57th government of Turkey
Turkish women academics
Turkish academic administrators
Women legal scholars